The 2012–13 season was the 108th overall season of football and the 80th season of competitive professional football in France.

The France men's national team began play on 15 August 2012, contesting a friendly match against Uruguay. The team also began contesting qualification matches for the 2014 FIFA World Cup. The men's youth international teams also began playing qualification matches for their yearly European Championship tournament. Les Espoirs concluded its qualification campaign for the 2013 UEFA European Under-21 Football Championship, while the under-19 and under-17 teams played qualification matches for the 2013 UEFA European Under-19 Football Championship and 2013 UEFA European Under-17 Football Championship, respectively.

Similarly, the women's team concluded its qualification campaign for UEFA Women's Euro 2013.

News

Broadcast rights
On 23 June 2011, the Ligue de Football Professionnel (LFP) confirmed that French television channel Canal+ had acquired four television packages for the next four seasons beginning with the 2012–13 and ending with the 2015–16 season. The organization also announced that independent broadcaster Al Jazeera had acquired two packages. The combined deals are valued at €510 million per season.

Schedule
To coincide with the new television rights deal, the LFP announced that the match days would be re-arranged. Beginning with the 2012–13 season, there will be one match played on Friday night at 21:00. On Saturday, a match will be contested at 17:00. At 19:00, four matches will be played and that will be followed by a match at 21:00. On Sunday, the early match will be played at 14:00. This will be followed by a match at 19:00. Finally, at 21:00, the match day will conclude with the showcase match.

Supercup in the United States
On 5 April 2012, the LFP announced that, for the fourth consecutive season, the Trophée des champions will be held on international soil. The match will be played in Harrison, New Jersey, at the Red Bull Arena and will be contested by the winner of Ligue 1 and the winner of the Coupe de France. The match will be played on 28 July 2012. Like the previous three years, the idea will be to promote French football abroad, but this time more specifically in the United States.

DNCG rulings

Ligue 2
On 11 July 2012, following a preliminary review of each club's administrative and financial accounts in Ligue 2, the DNCG ruled that Le Mans would be relegated to the Championnat National. Following the announcement, Le Mans club president Henri Legarda announced that the club would appeal the decision, stating the "shareholders will play their part and the club will go after every possible step to restore its rightful place in the sport".

National
On 12 June 2012, following a preliminary review of each club's administrative and financial accounts in the Championnat National, the DNCG ruled that Cherbourg would be relegated to the Championnat de France amateur due to the club possessing a financial debt of €200,000. Following the announcement, Cherbourg president Gérard Gohel announced that the club would appeal the decision. On 5 July, the DNCG reversed its decision to relegate Cherbourg after the club gained the €200,000 required to remain in the division.

Managerial changes

Ligue 1

Ligue 2

National

Transfers

Competitions

International competitions

Men's

Women's

National teams

France
Friendly

2014 FIFA World Cup qualification

Last updated: 16 October 2012Source: French Football Federation

France (women's)
UEFA Women's Euro 2013 qualification

Friendly

Last updated: 7 August 2014Source: French Football Federation

France U-21
2013 UEFA European Under-21 Football Championship qualification

Friendly

2013 UEFA European Under-21 Football Championship qualification playoffs

Last updated: 16 October 2012  Source: French Football Federation U-21 Schedule

France U-20
Four Nations Tournament

Friendly

Last updated: 24 October 2012Source: French Football Federation U-20 Schedule

France U-19

Friendly

2013 UEFA European Under-19 Football Championship First Round qualification

Last updated: 24 October 2012Source: French Football Federation U-19 Schedule

France U-18
Friendly

2012 Tournio de Limoges

Last updated: 24 October 2012Source: French Football Federation U-18 Schedule

France U-17

2013 UEFA European Under-17 Football Championship First Round qualification

2013 UEFA European Under-17 Championship elite round

Friendly

Last updated: 26 March 2013Source: Federation U-17 Schedule

France U-16

Friendly

2012 Tournoi du Val-de-Marne

2013 Aegean Cup

2013 Montaigu Tournament

Last updated: 4 June 2013Source: French Football Federation U-16 Schedule

Notes

References

External links
 Official site

 
Seasons in French football